Miha Ivanič (born 22 May 1998) is a Slovenian badminton player. He started his career in badminton when he was in the elementary school, and trained at the Medvode club. Partnered with Nika Arih, he won a bronze medal at the 2017 European Junior Championships in the mixed doubles event. He competed at the 2018 Mediterranean Games and 2019 European Games.

Achievements

European Junior Championships 
Mixed doubles

BWF International Challenge/Series (1 title, 5 runners-up) 
Men's singles

Men's doubles

Mixed doubles

  BWF International Challenge tournament
  BWF International Series tournament
  BWF Future Series tournament

References

External links 
 
 

1998 births
Living people
Slovenian male badminton players
Badminton players at the 2019 European Games
European Games competitors for Slovenia
Competitors at the 2018 Mediterranean Games
Competitors at the 2022 Mediterranean Games
Mediterranean Games competitors for Slovenia
20th-century Slovenian people
21st-century Slovenian people